Chaleins is a commune in the Ain department in eastern France.

History
The already known parish with the eleventh century depended on the rich person and powerful metropolitan chapter on Lyon which shared the capacity on Chaleins with various seigneuriales families, of which the Palatin family with the thirteenth century.

When the duke of Maine was a governor of Dombes in 1725, it gave up for 6,000 pounds its rights of justice on the grounds of Chaleins to Daniel Viste de Brindas.

In 1820, the borough of Chaleins had only ten houses which surrounded the church. The remainder of the population was disseminated in the hamlets. One still finds on the place of the houses in eye of ox dating from the eighteenth century. The old rectory was transformed into town hall in 1989; one can admire a pretty water jet there.

A river, Matre, crosses the village. Taking its source in Villeneuve and flowing in the Saône with Messimy, it supplied formerly 3 mills whose last one ceased its activities in 1950. It is a river with trout. While following his course, one can appreciate reserves of the cascades which supplied the mills.

Population

See also
Communes of the Ain department

References

Communes of Ain
Ain communes articles needing translation from French Wikipedia